Emil Thuy (1894-1930) was a German First World War fighter ace credited with 35 confirmed aerial victories. After his initial aerial victory while flying with a reconnaissance unit in September 1915, he would not shoot down another enemy airplane until 16 April 1917. Assigned to a fighter squadron, Jagdstaffel 21, he would score 13 more victories by 22 September 1917. Transferred to command Jagdstaffel 28, he would shoot down an additional 21 enemy airplanes by war's end.

List of victories

Victories are reported in chronological order.

This list is complete for entries, though obviously not for all details. Background data was abstracted from Above the Lines: The Aces and Fighter Units of the German Air Service, Naval Air Service and Flanders Marine Corps, 1914–1918, pp. 216–217, and The Aerodrome webpage on Emil Thuy . Abbreviations were expanded by the editor creating this list.

Aerial victories of Thuy, Emil
Thuy, Emil